David Gaines may refer to:
 David "Smokey" Gaines (1942–2020), American basketball player and coach
 David Gaines (environmentalist) (1947–1988), founder of the Mono Lake Committee
 David Gaines (racing driver) (1963–1990), NASCAR Limited Sportsman Division race car driver
 David Gaines (composer) (born 1961), United States musician and composer